
Year 517 (DXVII) was a common year starting on Sunday (link will display the full calendar) of the Julian calendar. At the time, it was known as the Year of the Consulship of Agapitus and Paulus (or, less frequently, year 1270 Ab urbe condita). The denomination 517 for this year has been used since the early medieval period, when the Anno Domini calendar era became the prevalent method in Europe for naming years.

Events 
 By place 
 Europe 
 King Sigismund of Burgundy is opposed by his son Sigeric, and has him strangled. Overcome with remorse, he retreats to the monastery that he founded, St. Maurice's Abbey (modern Switzerland).

 China 
 Emperor Wu Di of the Liang Dynasty becomes a Buddhist, and introduces the new religion to central China. He demands that sacrifices to imperial ancestors be changed to using dried meat, instead of the traditional animals (goats, pigs and cows).

 By topic 
 Religion 
 Council of Epaone: Bishops of southern Gaul convene near Epao (present Anneyron) in Burgundy. The synod enacts the first legislation against wooden altars, forbidding the building of any but stone altars with chrism (a mixture of oil and spice). 

 Science 
 Aryabhata compiles his manual of mathematics and astronomy (approximate date).

Births 
 Charibert I, king of the Franks (approximate date)
 Ebrulf, Frankish hermit and abbot (d. 596)

Deaths 
 April 5 – Timothy I, patriarch of Constantinople
 Dioscorus II, Coptic Orthodox patriarch of Alexandria
 Macedonius II, patriarch of Constantinople (approximate date)

References